Eddie Lee McQuarters (born April 16, 1943 in Tulsa, Oklahoma) is a former defensive tackle (number 61) for the Saskatchewan Roughriders from 1966–1974.  McQuarters was inducted into the Canadian Football Hall of Fame in 1988.

College and NFL
After a stellar career at the University of Oklahoma, Ed McQuarters was selected in the 18th round of the 1965 NFL Draft by the St. Louis Cardinals, but after one year was released.

Saskatchewan Roughriders
McQuarters was a defensive tackle, playing his entire 9-year career for Saskatchewan. The Green Riders played in four Grey Cup games during that period, winning in his rookie year, the 54th Grey Cup in 1966 against the Ottawa Rough Riders.

Mcquarters lost his left eye in a home workshop accident prior to the 1971 season, which limited his effectiveness but did not prevent him from playing up to the 1974 season, when he was cut after spending most of the year with knee injuries.

Honors and statistics
Ed McQuarters was a CFL all-star in 1967, 1968, and 1969, winning the CFL's Most Outstanding Lineman Award in 1967.

McQuarters had 10 fumble recoveries, one of them for an 80-yard touchdown, one interception for a touchdown, and four blocked kicks.

Video clips

References

1943 births
Living people
American players of Canadian football
Canadian football defensive linemen
Canadian Football Hall of Fame inductees
Oklahoma Sooners football players
Sportspeople from Tulsa, Oklahoma
St. Louis Cardinals (football) players
Saskatchewan Roughriders players